Roski is a Canadian composites manufacturer.

Roski may also refer to:

People
 Edward P. Roski (born 1938) U.S. real estate mogul
 Ulrich Roski (born 1944) German singer-songwriter

Places
 Roški Slap (Roski Falls), river Krka, Šibenik-Knin, Dalmatia, Croatia; at the Roški Slap Hydroelectric Power Plant

Other uses
 Roški Slap Hydroelectric Power Plant, Šibenik-Knin, Dalmatia, Croatia

See also
 Roszki, Poland a village
 Rozki (disambiguation)
 Russki (disambiguation)

Disambiguation pages